Cry Me a River may refer to:

Music
 "Cry Me a River" (Arthur Hamilton song), written by Arthur Hamilton in 1953, popularized by Julie London in 1955, and recorded by many performers
 Cry Me a River (album), by John Hicks, 1997
 "Cry Me a River" (Justin Timberlake song), 2002
 "Cry Me a River", a song by Pride and Glory from Pride & Glory, 1994

Other uses
 Cry Me a River (film), a 2008 Chinese short film by Jia Zhangke
 Cry Me a River (play), a 1997 revised version of Joyce Carol Oates's 1991 play Black
 Cry Me a River, a 1993 novel by T. R. Pearson
 "Cry Me a River", a 1996 Betty and Veronica comics story by Frank Doyle

See also 
 Crimean Riviera
 Hydrography of Crimea